Pak is a village in Badakhshan Province in north-eastern Afghanistan, close to the border with Tajikistan.

See also
Badakhshan Province

References

External links
Satellite map at Maplandia.com

Populated places in Wakhan District